Arncliffe Public School is a public primary school in the suburb of Arncliffe in Sydney, New South Wales, Australia. It is bounded by the Princes Highway, Avenal Street and Segenhoe Street.

History
Arncliffe Public School was originally the site of Arncliffe High School. It features a number of historical buildings including "Teluba" which is used by the St George School Education Area.
On Friday 4 November 2011, Arncliffe Public School turned 150 years.

See also 
 Athelstane Public School
 List of government schools in New South Wales: A–F

References

External links 
 Arncliffe Public School website
 NSW Department of Education and Training: Arncliffe Public School

Public primary schools in Sydney
Arncliffe, New South Wales